Liberty Public Schools (Sometimes referred to as Liberty 53 or LPS)  is a public school district in Liberty, Missouri, United States. Liberty Public Schools encompasses almost 85 square miles with more than 12,000 students grades Preschool through 12th in attendance. The district is one of the fastest growing school districts in the state of Missouri, with much of its growth occurring in the last 12 years.

LPS was recognized as a high performing school district for all 12 years the State of Missouri presented the Distinction in Performance Award, making it one of only 6% of Missouri districts to be placed in this category.

District Achievements

 LPS was renewed with the prestigious AdvancED Accreditation in 2017.
 LPS was named to the League of Innovative School Districts in 2017.
 LPS named one of Best Communities for Music Education for five consecutive years (2012-2017).
 Named to AP (Advanced Placement) Honor Roll Distinction, one of only 6 districts state-wide
 Recognized for implementation of Project Lead the Way in every district building (K-12).
 Received near perfect review on most recent Annual Performance Report, receiving over 98% of points possible.

Liberty Board of Education
The Liberty Board of Education is a body of members elected by the voters of Liberty Missouri. The purpose of the board is to supervise the day-to-day operations of the school district, and to ensure that the district is upheld to state statues and the rules and regulations of the Missouri State School Board and the Missouri Department of Education (DESE).

Board of Education meetings are held on the first Tuesday at 7:00 a.m. and third Tuesday of each month at 7:00 p.m. at the Liberty School District Administration Center.

Liberty Education Foundation
Grants to the school district are provided through the Foundation.

Broadcast Stations
Liberty Public Schools has a broadcast station solely for district use that is broadcast throughout the City of Liberty. They have a partnership with Spectrum Cable to broadcast the channel on Channel 18 to Spectrum customers.

Schools

High Schools (9-12)

 Liberty High School (LHS)
 Liberty North High School (LNHS)

Alternative High Schools (9-12)

 Liberty Academy

Middle Schools (6-8)

 Discovery Middle School (Formerly South Valley Junior High, an 8th and 9th grade school) (DMS)
 Heritage Middle School (Formerly Liberty Junior High, an 8th and 9th grade school) (HMS)
 Liberty Middle School (LMS)
 South Valley Middle School (SVMS)

Elementary Schools (K-5)

 Alexander Doniphan Elementary
 EPiC Elementary
 Franklin Elementary
 Kellybrook Elementary
 Lewis and Clark Elementary (LC)
 Liberty Oaks Elementary
 Lillian Schumacher Elementary
 Manor Hill Elementary
 Ridgeview Elementary
 Shoal Creek Elementary
 Warren Hills Elementary

Pre-Schools

 Early Childhood Center (ECC Or LECC)

References

External links
 Official website

School districts in Missouri
Education in Clay County, Missouri